The 2022 BWF season was the overall badminton circuit organized by the Badminton World Federation (BWF) for the 2022 badminton season to publish and promote the sport. The world badminton tournament in 2022 consisted of:
 BWF Major Events Tournaments (Grade 1)
 BWF World Men's and Women's Team Championships (Thomas & Uber Cup)
 BWF World Championships

 BWF World Tour (Grade 2)
 BWF World Tour Finals (Level 1)
 BWF World Tour Super 1000 (Level 2)
 BWF World Tour Super 750 (Level 3)
 BWF World Tour Super 500 (Level 4)
 BWF World Tour Super 300 (Level 5)
 BWF Tour Super 100 (Level 6)

 BWF Continental Circuit (Grade 3)
 BWF International Challenge (Level 1) 
 BWF International Series (Level 2)
 BWF Future Series (Level 3)

The Thomas & Uber Cup were team events. The others – Super 1000, Super 750, Super 500, Super 300, Super 100, International Challenge, International Series, and Future Series were all individual tournaments. The higher the level of tournament, the larger the prize money and the more ranking points available.

The 2022 BWF season calendar comprised these six levels of BWF tournaments.

Schedule 
This is the complete schedule of events on the 2022 calendar, with the champions and runners-up documented.
Key

January

February

March

April

May

June

July

August

September

October

November

December

Retirements 
Following is a list of notable players (winners of the main tour title, and/or part of the BWF Rankings top 100 for at least one week) who announced their retirement from professional badminton, during the 2022 season:
  Li Yinhui (born 11 March 1997 in Wuhan, Hubei, China) reached a career-high of no. 5 in the women's doubles on 17 March 2020 and no. 3 in the mixed doubles on 24 August 2017. She won eight individual titles and also two bronze medals at the BWF World Championships. Li was part of the Chinese team that won gold at the 2019 Asia Mixed Team Championships and Sudirman Cup. Li announced her retirement through her social media account. Chinese media reported that she and Du Yue were removed from the world rankings on 25 January 2022. The 2020 Summer Olympics was her last tournament.
  Sam Magee (born 9 January 1990 in Raphoe, Donegal, Ireland) reached a career-high of no. 21 in the mixed doubles on 6 August 2015. He won the boys' doubles title at the 2009 European Junior Championships, and bronze medals at the European Games in the mixed doubles event with his sister Chloe Magee in 2015 and 2019, and also in the men's doubles with his brother Joshua Magee in 2015. Together with Chloe, he also won a bronze medal at the 2017 European Championships. He announced his retirement from international tournaments on 16 February 2022. The 2021 European Championships was his last tournament.
  Lee Meng Yean (born 30 March 1994 in Malacca, Malaysia) reached a career-high of no. 10 in the women's doubles on 2 February 2021. She was the gold medalist at the World Junior Championships in mixed team and bronze at the women's and mixed doubles; and bronze at the 2019 Southeast Asian Games and 2013 Summer Universiade in women's doubles. She helped the Malaysian team win bronze at the 2020 Asian Women's Team Championships. Her retirement was in conjunction with her appointment as a doubles coach for the Badminton Association of Malaysia on 25 February 2022. The 2021 Indonesia Open was her last tournament.
  Ajay Jayaram (born 28 September 1987 in Chennai, India) reached a career-high of no. 13 in the men's singles on 25 May 2017. He was a member of the Indian team that won a bronze medal at the 2016 Asia Team Championships. Jayaram also won five individual titles including 2 Grand Prix titles at the Dutch Open in 2014 and 2015. He announced his retirement from international tournaments on 26 March 2022. The 2022 India Open was his last tournament.
  Danny Bawa Chrisnanta (born 30 December 1988 in Salatiga, Central Java, Indonesia) reached a career-high of no. 16 in the men's doubles on 16 April 2015 and no. 9 in the mixed doubles on 28 February 2013. He won the silver medal at the 2014 Commonwealth Games and the bronze medal at the 2015 Southeast Asian Games in the men's doubles with Chayut Triyachart. He won 15 titles in BWF sanctioned tournaments in both men's and mixed doubles. He announced his retirement from professional badminton on 27 May 2022 through his Instagram page. The 2021 Southeast Asian Games was his last tournament. 
  Ni Ketut Mahadewi Istarani (born 12 September 1994 in Tabanan, Bali, Indonesia) reached a career high of no. 13 in the women's doubles on 25 January 2018. She was part of Indonesia team that won the silver medal at the 2019 Southeast Asian Games, and bronze medals at the 2015 and 2017 edition, and won 4 titles in the BWF sanctioned tournaments. She announced her retirement from the international tournaments on 11 June 2022. The 2021 Bahrain International Challenge was her last tournament.
  Greysia Polii (born 11 August 1987 in Jakarta, Indonesia) reached a career high of no. 2 in the women's doubles on 28 January 2016. She won gold medals in the women's doubles at the 2014 Asian Games, at the 2019 Southeast Asian Games and at the 2020 Summer Olympics. Polii officially announced her retirement in a press conference on 3 June 2022 and had her testimonial at the Istora Gelora Bung Karno on 12 June 2022. The 2022 All England Open was her last tournament.
  Liu Cheng (born 4 January 1992 in Sanming, Fujian, China) reached a career-high of no. 2 in both men's and mixed doubles events. He won the men's doubles title at the 2017 World Championships with Zhang Nan, and was part of the Chinese team that won the Sudirman Cup in 2015 and 2021, the Thomas Cup in 2018, and also the Asian Games in 2018. Liu announced his retirement through his social media account on 30 June 2022. The 2022 Thomas Cup was his last tournament.
  Wong Wing Ki (born 18 March 1990 as Wong Shu Ki in British Hong Kong) reached a career-high of no. 10 in men's singles on 25 May 2017. He won the 2016 Vietnam Open Grand Prix title, and was part of the Hong Kong team that won the silver medal at the 2013 East Asian Games. Wong announced his retirement through his Instagram account on 10 August 2022, and retired after his final match on 24 August 2022. The 2022 BWF World Championships was his last tournament.
  Thomas Rouxel (born 26 May 1991 in Rennes, France) reached a career-high of no. 38 in men's singles on 2 November 2021. He was part of the French team that won silver and bronze in the European Men's and Women's Team Badminton Championships in 2016 and 2018 respectively. He was a runner-up at the 2019 Orléans Masters Super 100 event. Rouxel announced his retirement through social media on 2 September 2022. The 2022 Indonesia Open was his last tournament.
  Toby Penty (born 12 August 1992 in Walton-on-Thames, England) reached a career-high of no. 43 in men's singles on 15 November 2018. He won the 2017 Scottish Open Grand Prix title, and was part of the English team that won the silver medal at the 2015 European Mixed Team Badminton Championships, 2018 European Men's team and 2014 European Men's Team badminton championships. Penty announced his retirement on 6 September 2022. The 2022 BWF World Championships was his last tournament.
  Sayaka Takahashi (born 29 July 1992 in Kashihara, Nara, Japan) reached a career-high of no. 10 in women's singles on 12 February 2019. She was part of the Japanese team that won gold in the 2018 Uber Cup and was also part of the squad that won silver in the 2021 Sudirman Cup. She won her biggest career title in the 2018 Singapore Open and finished as runner-up in the 2021 French Open. Takahashi announced her retirement on 20 September 2022. The 2022 Japan Open was her last tournament.
  Chen Long (born 18 January 1989 in Jingzhou, Hubei, China) reached a career-high of no. 1 in men's singles on 25 December 2014. He won the gold medal at the 2016 Olympic Games, silver medal at the 2020 Olympic Games, and the bronze medal at the 2012 Olympic Games. He also won two consecutive men's singles titles at the BWF World Championships, at the 2014 and 2015 editions. Chen  was also part of the Chinese team that won the Sudirman Cup in 2009, 2011, 2013, 2015 and 2019, the Thomas Cup in 2010, 2012 and 2018, and also the Asian Games in 2010 and 2018. Even though he has not publicly announced his retirement, his BWF world ranking was removed on 4 October 2022, leading to most speculating about his retirement. The 2020 Olympic Games was his last international tournament.

References

External links
 Badminton World Federation (BWF) at bwfbadminton.com

 
World Tour
Badminton World Federation seasons